Bradyrrhoa confiniella is a species of snout moth in the genus Bradyrrhoa. It was described by Zeller in 1848 and is known from Crete, Greece, Albania, North Macedonia, Bulgaria, Croatia, Italy, Sicily and Corsica.

References

Phycitini
Moths described in 1848
Moths of Europe
Moths of Asia